José Rizaldy Taduran Zshornack (30 December 1937 – 18 November 2002) was a Filipino actor. Zshornack had a long career spanning the 1950s to the 1990s.

His name Zaldy is derived from his birthdate, 30 December, which is celebrated as Rizal Day in the Philippines, in honor of its national hero.

Personal life
He was of Filipino, German, and Spanish descent. He was married to former Filipino American beauty queen Shirley Gorospe and together they had two children.

Zaldy grew up in Caloocan. He went to Cecilio Apostol Elementary School and briefly attended Manila Central University prior to being discovered by Doña Adela H., vda de Santiago of Premiere Productions.

Death
In 1990, Zaldy moved back to the Philippines from the United States where he resided since the early 1970s.

He died on 18 November 2002, aged 64, from complications resulting from adult onset diabetes.

Filmography

Film
1952: Malolos (Premiere)
1956: Lo' Waist Gang (Larry Santiago)
1956: Montalan Brothers (Larry Santiago)
1957: Libre Comida (Balatbat)
1957: Barumbado (People's)
1957: Ukulele Boy (Larry Santiago)
1957: Kamay ni Cain (People's)
1957: Bicol Express (Premiere)
1957: Los lacuacheros (Larry Santiago)
1957: Yaya Maria (Premiere)
1957: Sweethearts (C. Santiago Film Organization)
1957: Pusakal (People's)
1957: Kamay ni Cain (People's)
1957: Tokyo 1960 (C.Santiago Film Org)
1957: Bakya mo Neneng (Premiere)
1958: Batang Piyer (People's)
1958: Fighting Tisoy (Larry Santiago)
1958: Man on the Run (Cirio H. Santiago Film Organization)
1958: Shirley,  My Darling (People's)
1958: Obra-Maestra (People's)
1958: You're My Everything (People's)
1958: Anak ng Lasengga (People's)
1958: Wanted: Husband (People's)
1960: Walang daigdig (Larry Santiago)

References

External links
 

1937 births
2002 deaths
Filipino male film actors
Filipino people of German descent
Filipino people of Polish descent
People from Manila
People from Muntinlupa
Male actors from Metro Manila
Deaths from diabetes
People from Caloocan